Menno Heus (born 17 December 1995) is a Dutch football player who plays for SV Spakenburg.

He is a well-known character who gave up his beloved Bunnikside to support the rival MI-side. Also known as One Man Menno.

Club career
He made his professional debut in the Eerste Divisie for Jong FC Utrecht on 26 August 2016 in a game against Jong PSV.

In the beginning of 2019, Heus joined FC Den Bosch on their training camp in Sevilla. His trail went good and he officially signed for the club on 11 January 2019 for the rest of the season, as the third choice on the goalkeeper position. Ahead of the 2019-20 season, he joined FC Lienden.

References

External links
 
 

1995 births
People from Oosterhout
Living people
Dutch footballers
Jong FC Utrecht players
FC Den Bosch players
FC Lienden players
Eerste Divisie players
Derde Divisie players
Association football goalkeepers
Footballers from North Brabant